Marion Municipal Airport  is located three miles southwest of Marion, in Grant County, Indiana. The FAA's National Plan of Integrated Airport Systems for 2021–2025 categorized it as a general aviation facility.

The airport saw commercial airline service by Lake Central Airlines using Douglas DC-3s beginning in 1956. Lake Central merged into Allegheny Airlines in 1968 using Aerospatiale N 262s before service was discontinued in 1970. The airport was then served by small commuter airlines during the 1970s.

Facilities
It has two asphalt runways: 4/22 is 6,011 by 100 feet (1,832 x 30 m) and 15/33 is 3,456 by 100 feet (1,053 x 30 m).

In 2019 the airport had 10,873 aircraft operations, an average of 30 per day: 92% general aviation, 7% air taxi and 1% military. In December 2021, there were 40 aircraft based at this airport: 34 single-engine, 2 multi-engine, 2 jet and 2 helicopter.

References

External links 
 Aerial photo as of 11 April 1998 from USGS The National Map
 

Airports in Indiana
Transportation buildings and structures in Grant County, Indiana